Sanford Burnham Prebys is a 501(c)(3) non-profit medical research institute focusing on basic and translation research, with major research programs in cancer,  n-e-u-r-o-degeneration, diabetes, infectious, inflammatory, and childhood diseases. The institute also specializes in stem cell research and drug discovery technologies.

The Institute employs more than 500 scientists and staff at its campus in La Jolla, California. It is recognized for its NCI-designated Cancer Center, its drug discovery center (Conrad Prebys Center for Chemical Genomics) and the Sanford Children’s Health Research Center. It also has strategic partnerships with the biotech and pharmaceutical industry.

Sanford Burnham Prebys is one of seven fundamental research institutes in the United States and runs an NCI-designated cancer center. It is also listed in the top 2% of research institutions globally by the amount of citations. In terms of nonprofit/non-government institutes in the field of biomedical science, it is ranked #6 nationally.

Since its inception in 1976, the institute has grown from a small building in West San Diego to a campus in La Jolla including an accredited graduate school with more than 350 postdocs, graduate students and interns mentored per year. Current Institute educational programs serve trainees with professional development programs, postdoctoral scientific training and graduate programs in Biomedical Sciences. The Sanford Burnham Prebys educational system partners with the Sanford Burnham Prebys Science Network, the Office of Education, Training & International Services to cover an array of scientific career and professional development topics.

History

William H. Fishman, M.D., Ph.D., and his wife, Lillian Waterman Fishman, founded the La Jolla Cancer Research Foundation in 1976 after retiring from Tufts University School of Medicine. The Foundation focused on onco-development, the study of developmental biology in conjunction with oncology.

In 1996, the foundation was renamed The Burnham Institute in honor of San Diego businessman Malin Burnham after he joined with an anonymous donor to contribute $10 million; in 2006, it was renamed the Burnham Institute for Medical Research. In 2007, T. Denny Sanford gave the institute $20 million through Sanford Health, a hospital which had received significant donations from T. Denny Sanford previously, allowing it to create the Sanford Children's Health Research Center, which has sites in Sioux Falls, South Dakota, and La Jolla, California, the latter within the campus of the institute.

In 2008, Sanford Burnham Prebys was awarded a $97.9 million grant by NIH to establish a high-throughput screening center.

In 2010, the institute adopted the name Sanford-Burnham Medical Research Institute following a $50 million pledge of support from Sanford.

An anonymous gift of $275 million was made in 2014, which was later cut to $200 million.

In 2015, the institute changed its name again to Sanford Burnham Prebys following a $100 million gift from philanthropist Conrad Prebys.

Research

Sanford Burnham Prebys was founded with its primary focus on cancer research. The Institute ranks consistently among the world's top 25 organizations for its research impact, according to Thomson Scientific data. It also ranks among the top 3% of research institutes in the United States in National Institutes of Health grant funding.

Research staff in Sanford Burnham Prebys’ laboratories numbers over 520 including postdoctoral researchers; an additional 30 graduate students and 164 administrative and support personnel to bring the total number of employees to over 500.

The institute is home to six research centers:

 NCI-designated Cancer Center
 Infectious and Inflammatory Disease Center
 Center for Genetic Disorders and Aging Research
 Sanford Children's Health Research Center
 Conrad Prebys Center for Chemical Genomics
 Center for Stem Cells and Regenerative Medicine

A partnership for the study of the biology of ageing that includes the Salk Institute for Biological Studies and the University of California, San Diego is made up of Sanford Burnham Prebys and the San Diego Nathan Shock Center.

There are seven research programs at Sanford Burnham Prebys:

Cell and Molecular Biology of Cancer Program 
Insights into the complex system of networks and mechanisms that tumors use to survive and proliferate. Findings build dialogue with clinicians and physician scientists across the country and in neighboring institutions to ensure the translational and human relevance of the research.

Degenerative Diseases Program 
Understanding how cells discriminate between functional and nonfunctional proteins. Discoveries about the damaging impact of oxidative stress on protein structure and function in the neurodegenerative diseases of Alzheimer's and Parkinson's, metabolic diseases of diabetes and liver failure, and inflammatory disease and cancer. Findings are translated into new therapies that improve protein folding and preserve cell function in diseases that have global health impact.

Development, Aging and Regeneration Program
Using model organisms—mice, fish, flies, worms and human stem cells to 

 Unravel gene functions linked to mutations and epigenetic factors; 
 Explore the development and regenerative capacity of the brain, heart, muscles, pancreas, limbs, liver and other organs; and 
 Probe the biology of aging and organ/tissue maintenance to maintain a well-functioning organism. Insights provide the tools needed to uncover novel therapeutic targets for heart disease, neurodegeneration, muscle disorders, diabetes, cancer and other debilitating diseases.

Human Genetics Program
Research of new genetic disorders and improving understanding of those with previous knowledge. Using zebrafish, mouse models, patient cells and stem cell technologies, probe the pathological mechanisms of genetic disorders to address unanswered questions. This research has led to diagnostic tests and novel therapies for patients.

Immunity and Pathogenesis Program 
Research to understand the regulation and interplay of host immune responses and microbial pathogenesis; also studying viral-host interactions, innate and humoral immunity, inflammation and T cell checkpoint regulation. This research provides therapeutic opportunities to address medical needs, including the treatment of endemic and pandemic infectious diseases, autoimmune disorders, cancer and inflammatory diseases.

Tumor Initiation and Maintenance Program 
Focus on RNA biology and the signaling pathways that regulate cell growth and cell fate; what drives cancer cell growth, to lead to treatments for brain, breast and prostate cancers, as well as melanoma and leukemia.

Aging, Cancer and Immunology Program 
Studies the interplay between cancer cells, the microenvironment and immune cells regulates the growth and metastasis of solid and hematologic malignancies. Focus on the microbiome, cell migration/invasion, cell signaling, angiogenesis and immunology.

Educational Programs 
In addition to its research mission, Sanford Burnham Prebys has a broad educational mission. Established in 2005, the institute's Graduate School of Biomedical Sciences offers a Ph.D. degree in Biomedical Sciences. In 2015, Sanford Burnham Prebys achieved accreditation with the Western Association of Schools and Colleges. Sanford Burnham Prebys also employs postdoctoral fellows; there are typically around 125 postdocs training at the Institute at any time.

The graduate school is focused in biomedical research and is supplemented by the technologies developed to facilitate breakthroughs in medical practice. The program offers a foundation in biomedical science with project opportunities in biology, chemistry, bioinformatics and engineering, with focus on one of the main foundations of biomedical science within a laboratory specializing in the area.

It is a small program with eight openings per year and a steady state of thirty students. Entering graduate students are admitted to their thesis labs on day one and do not perform laboratory rotations. The graduate school has a short time to degree, averaging 4.7 years. In. the first two years, students complete five core courses, six tutorials and one elective. Instruction is accompanied by extensive practical laboratory training under the supervision of faculty.

Funding
In January 2020, Sanford Burnham Prebys reported $117M in annual revenue.  

The sources of funding in 2019 were: 58% federal; 22% private philanthropy; 8% biopharma partnerships; 8% licensing & other and 4% other grants.

Philanthropy has played a major role in the growth and expansion of the institution. Donations from the Whittaker Corporation and the California Foundation enabled the acquisition a five-acre site on the La Jolla mesa. Donations from philanthropists and the institute's namesakes—T. Denny Sanford, Malin and Roberta Burnham, and Conrad Prebys—have helped to ensure the institute's continued growth.

Select scientific achievements
The Institute initially focused on the commonalities between cancer and fetal development, known as onco-developmental biology. Significant early discoveries include development of monoclonal antibody-based ‘two-site’ ELISA. In the 1980s, the Institute became known for its work on fibronectin and other extracellular matrix components, and cell adhesion. Some of the highlights include the discovery of the RGD tripeptide as the cell attachment site in fibronectin, fibrinogen, and other adhesive proteins, and the discovery of integrins, the cell surface receptors that recognize the RGD sequence in matrix proteins.

In the 1990s, Institute scientists made important contributions to research on programmed cell death prominence with the discovery of several previously unknown pro- and anti-apoptotic proteins, namely caspases, IAPs, and Bcl-2 family members.

The demonstration by Institute scientists that cells deprived of attachment to extracellular matrix commit suicide by apoptosis, named Anoikis, connected the cell adhesion and apoptosis fields. These findings essentially explained why normal cells stay in their appropriate place, whereas cancer cells spread and metastasize. Reduced integrin function in malignant cells makes it possible for them to leave their original tissue and increased expression of anti-apoptotic proteins prevents anoikis, enabling cancer invasion and metastasis. Several drugs have been brought to the clinic for the treatment of cancer and other diseases based on the fundamental RGD/integrin and apoptosis studies at the institute.

More recently, the institute has expanded its research to several additional areas, including neuroscience, cardiovascular diseases, rare diseases of sugar and phosphate metabolism. The common trend is discovery of proteins that are linked to the development of a disease and identification of chemical compounds (or antibodies) that bind to those proteins and inhibit or enhance their function.  Such compounds become candidate drugs for the treatment of the disease. Several compounds developed either at the Institute or by biopharmaceutical companies are now in clinical trials. Pioneering studies at the Institute showed that simple sugars such as D-mannose, L-fucose and D-galactose are effective therapies for a set of rare genetic disorders. Some are currently in clinical trials.

Collaboration and partnerships

Sanford Burnham Prebys  has working relationships with the University of California, San Diego, The Scripps Research Institute, the Salk Institute for Biological Studies, and the Mayo Clinic.

Sanford Burnham Prebys also collaborates with pharmaceutical companies to move research breakthroughs from the lab out to the public. Recent agreements include partners such as Lilly, Daiichi-Sankyo, and Boehringer Ingelheim.

References

External links
Official website

Medical research institutes in California
Cancer organizations based in the United States
Stem cell research
La Jolla, San Diego
Independent research institutes
501(c)(3) organizations